Taha may refer to:

 Ta-Ha, the 20th sura of the Qur'an
 Taha (name), a male given name and a surname
 Taha, Ghana, a community in Tamale Metropolitan District in the Northern Region of Ghana